The Western Switzerland Railways (Chemins de fer de la Suisse Occidentale, shortened to Suisse-Occidentale; SO or S-O), were initially a joint operation of three Swiss railway companies, but these companies merged on 1 January 1872. The company was called the Western Switzerland–Simplon Railways (Chemins de fer de la Suisse Occidentale et du Simplon, shortened to Suisse-Occidentale–Simplon; SOS or SO-S) from 28 June 1881. The SOS merged with the Bernese Jura Railways (Chemins de fer du Jura bernois; JBL) to form the Jura–Simplon Railways (Compagnie des Chemins de Fer Jura–Simplon; JS) on 1 January 1890.

Association of the Railways of Western Switzerland 

In the early 1860s, the rail links between Romandy and German-speaking Switzerland were controlled by three railway companies, the West Switzerland Company (Compagnie de l’Ouest Suisse; SO), the Franco-Swiss Company (Franco-Suisse, FS) and the Lausanne–Fribourg–Bern Railway (Chemin de fer Lausanne–Fribourg–Berne, LFB). One of the lines ran from Lausanne along the southern foot of the Jura to Biel/Bienne and on to Herzogenbuchsee, where it met the competing line running via Fribourg and Bern. The West Switzerland and Franco-Swiss were thus opponents of the Lausanne–Fribourg–Bern, which also owned the westernmost Geneva–Versoix line. This harsh competitive situation was compounded by financial difficulties due to construction cost overruns.
 
After long and difficult negotiations, the three railway companies formed a business association under the name of the Association des chemins de fer de la Suisse Occidentale (Association of the Railways of Western Switzerland) on 1 January 1865. Each railway company provided its own infrastructure and rolling stock. Revenue was distributed according to a fixed ratio. The business community was managed by a three-member operating committee—with each company nominating a representative—and a supervisory board. Three members of the Supervisory Board were appointed by the Western Switzerland and two each by Franco-Swiss and the canton of Fribourg. The association paid 8,000 francs per kilometre per year to the firm of Laurent-Bergeron et Comp. The financial situation of the three western Swiss railways stabilised and from 1868 onwards the association was able to pay a very modest dividend. Financial and construction matters remained the responsibility of individual railway companies.

Ownership of the network of the Association of the Railways of Western Switzerland 

The map shows the ownership structure of the network of the Association of French-Swiss Railways at the end of 1871 before its merger as the Western Switzerland Railways.

Western Switzerland Railways Company

 
The three railways agreed to intensify their cooperation in 1871. The business would no longer be leased to a company, but run directly. Under pressure from the French-speaking cantons, especially Vaud, the three West Swiss railways merged on 1 January 1872. The new Western Switzerland Railway Company (Chemins de fer de la Suisse Occidentale et du Simplon) now had the largest route network of any Swiss rail company with 315 kilometres of line. The cantons used their influence to help the Western Switzerland build the Palezieux–Payerne–Fräschels line (known in French as the ligne de la Broye longitudinale—longitudinal Broye line) and the Fribourg–Yverdon railway (transverse Broye line). These lines were originally intended to form the western end of the Swiss National Railway (Schweizerischen Nationalbahn; SNB).
 
The shares of the merged railway companies were exchanged for those of the Western Switzerland Railway, whereby, depending on the share price, additional payments were made in the form of bonds totalling Swiss francs (CFF) 14 million. The capital of the Western Switzerland was composed of shares worth CFF 85 million and bonds worth CFF 102 million at the end of 1876 following the closing of this financial transaction. The Swiss Central Railway (Schweizerische Schweizerische Centralbahn) and the Swiss Northeastern Railway (Schweizerische Nordostbahn), together with a banking group that was responsible for funding the expansion of rail networks, attempted unsuccessfully to raise the necessary funds for the Western Switzerland and to form a joint operation between the three railways. The funding was provided by the Societe Suisse pour l'industrie des chemins de fer ("Swiss Company for the Railway Industry"), which forced the SO to reorganise the administration. Its board of four members was replaced by a single director in 1875.
 
In 1872, the Western Switzerland acquired a significant stake in the Jougne-Eclépens Railway (Chemin de fer de Jougne à Eclépens; JE), which had a direct connection to the network of the French Chemins de fer de Paris à Lyon et à la Méditerranée (PLM). The SO wanted to prevent a competitor taking over the JE, which was constantly fighting financial problems. The Jougne-Eclépens Railway went bankrupt in 1876 and was taken over fully by the Western Switzerland.
 
There were four deaths and three injuries after a collision in Palézieux on 7 July 1876.

Western Switzerland–Simplon Railways

The Western Switzerland–Simplon Railways (Suisse-Occidentale–Simplon; SOS) was created on 26 June 1881 as a result of the purchase of the Simplon Company (Ligne du Simplon; S) by the Western Switzerland at a price of around CFF 13.2 million. Since the Simplon Company was financially too weak to promote the construction of a Simplon tunnel, the canton of Vaud in particular pushed for a merger of the two railways. The SOS, with investment capital of CHF 248 million and a network length of 581 kilometres, was the largest railway company in Switzerland at the time. The Geneva–Lausanne–Brig routes and the extensions from Lausanne via Romont to Bern and via Yverdon and Neuchâtel to La Neuveville formed its main route network. Its strategically most important goal was the building of a connection from Brig to Domodossola by tunnelling under the Simplon Pass, but this did not proceed for the time being. The SOS invested around CFF 670,000 in preparatory work in 1886 alone.
 
The SOS commissioned the Saint-Gingolph–Saint-Maurice railway, the Swiss section of the railway along the south shore of Lake Geneva on 1 June 1886. The Savoy section from Saint-Gingolph to Évian-les-Bains belonged to the Paris-Lyon-Mediterranean Railway (Chemins de fer de Paris à Lyon et à la Méditerranée; PLM).
 
On 21 January 1888, large masses of rock disintegrated at Cheyres and fell on the track creating piles of rubble two or three metres high. A Payerne–Yverdon passenger train loaded with about 40 passengers ran into the rubble, causing the two locomotives to derail. The fireman of the bank engine was killed, while the other fireman and the driver of the bank engine were seriously injured.
 
The Western Switzerland Railway and the SOS operated other railway lines:
 Jougne–Vallorbe–Pontarlier and Verrières–Pontarlier line of the French Compagnie des chemins de fer de Paris à Lyon et à la Méditerranée (PLM)
 Bulle–Romont railway (Chemin de fer Bulle-Romont, BR)
 Pont–Vallorbe Railway (Chemin de fer Pont–Vallorbe, PV)
 Travers–Buttes railway (Régional du Val-de-Travers, RVT)
 Simplon Company (Compagnie du Simplon, S)
 
The operating results of Western Switzerland–Simplon Railways were always positive. Freight and passenger traffic contributed approximately equally to this. The SOS was able to distribute a modest dividend every year.

Network of the Western Switzerland–Simplon (SOS) 
The following map shows the Western Switzerland–Simplon route network before the merger with the Jura–Bern–Lucerne (JBL):

Merger of the Jura-Simplon Railway 
On 1 January 1890, the SOS merged with the Jura-Bern-Lucerne Railway (JBL), including the Gümligen–Lucerne line, which belonged to the canton of Bern, to form the newly established Jura–Simplon Railways (JS). The Swiss Confederation also participated in the new railway company by means of a voluntary share purchase. Exactly one year later, the Jura–Simplon Railways took over the Pont Vallorbe Railway operated by the SOS. The JS eventually initiated the construction of the Simplon Tunnel, which had been discussed for decades.

Graphic summary 
Overview of the history of the Western Switzerland–Simplon (O: opening;   T: takeover):

Network

Rolling stock
From 1881, the SO designated their locomotives with Roman numerals: classes I and II consisted of locomotives with two drive axles, class III consisted of passenger locomotives with three drive axles and class IV consisted of freight locomotives with three drive axles. In rolling stock statistics, these class designations were partly used from 1873. The locomotives acquired from the Jougne–Eclépens Railway were named in the statistics as class V and the  Simplon Company locomotives as class IV. The locomotives were designated according to the uniform system used throughout Switzerland from 1887.

This is a list of the locomotives used by the SO and the SOS. The designation of the class valid from 1902 is listed in brackets.

During shortages of rolling stock—especially during the Franco-Prussian War period—the SO responded by renting mostly French locomotives.

References

Notes

Footnotes

Sources
 
 
 
 
 
 

Defunct railway companies of Switzerland
1890 disestablishments in Switzerland
Swiss companies established in 1872
Railway companies established in 1872
Railway companies disestablished in 1890